Daphnella dilecta is a species of sea snail, a marine gastropod mollusk in the family Raphitomidae.

Description
The length of the shell attains 11 mm.

Distribution
D. dilecta can be found in Caribbean waters, off the northwestern coast of Cuba.

References

 Sarasúa, H. (1992) Especie nueva en Daphnellinae (Gastropoda: Turridae). Publicações Ocasionais da Sociedade Portuguesa de Malacologia, 16, 37–38.

External links
  Rosenberg, G.; Moretzsohn, F.; García, E. F. (2009). Gastropoda (Mollusca) of the Gulf of Mexico, Pp. 579–699 in: Felder, D.L. and D.K. Camp (eds.), Gulf of Mexico–Origins, Waters, and Biota. Texas A&M Press, College Station, Texas
 

dilecta
Gastropods described in 1992